Rogate railway station, also known variously as Rogate for Harting, and Rogate and Harting, supposedly served these two villages in the county of West Sussex in England. However the station was a mile and a half away from both of these places, and was in fact in the village of Nyewood.

The station was on the former London and South Western Railway line between Petersfield and Midhurst. The line opened on 1 September 1864. Rogate station originally featured two platforms controlled by a fully operational signal box, however from 1932 the box was only used for the handling of trains for the goods yard. The line closed to all traffic after the last train on 5 February 1955.

The station is now used as offices.

References 

Disused railway stations in West Sussex
Railway stations in Great Britain opened in 1864
Railway stations in Great Britain closed in 1955
Former London and South Western Railway stations